Hilal Çetinkaya (born March 3, 1997) is a Turkish women's football midfielder currently playing in the Turkish Women's First Football League for Kireçburnu Spor in Istanbul with jersey number 28. She is member of the Turkey national U-17 and U-19 teams.

She was born in Kadıköy, Istanbul on March 3, 1997. Currently, she is studying hairstyling at Mevlana Vocational Highschool in Ataşehir.

Career

Club

Hilal Çetinkaya obtained her license on March 26, 2010. Since the 2012–13 season, she is part of Ataşehir Belediyespor playing in the Turkeish Women's First League. She was also member of the youth team of her club, which play in the Turkish Girls' Football Championship.

Çetinkaya plays futsal in her highschool's team. She was part of the team representing Turkey at the 2014 ISF World Schools Futsal Championship held in Italy that became champion in the girls' category. She was named top scorer of the tournament with 17 goals before her teammate, the only 14-year-old Kader Hançar, who netted 15 goals.

In October 2017, Çerinkaya transferred to Kireçburnu Spor.

International
Çetinkaya was admitted to the Turkey girls' U-17 team debuting in the friendly match against the Azeri girls on September 9, 2012. On November 26, 2013, she played her first game in the Turkey national U-19 team again in a friendly match against the junior women from Azerbaijan.

Career statistics
.

Honours
 Turkey Women's First Football League
 Ataşehir Belediyespor
 Runners-up (4): 2012–13, 2013–14, 2014–15, 2015–16
 Third places (1): 2016–17

 ISF World Schools Futsal Championship
 Mevlana Vocational Highschool team
 Winners (1): 2014

References

External links
 

Living people
1997 births
People from Kadıköy
Footballers from Istanbul
Turkish women's futsal players
Turkish women's footballers
Women's association football midfielders
Turkey women's international footballers
Ataşehir Belediyespor players
Kireçburnu Spor players